My 600-lb Life is an American reality television series that airs on TLC. The series premiered in February 2012. The show also has its own spinoff: Where Are They Now?

As of February 1, 2023, 131 episodes of My 600-lb Life have aired, concluding the tenth season.

Series overview

Episodes

Season 1 (2012)

Season 2 (2014)

Season 3 (2015)

Season 4 (2016)

Season 5 (2017)

Season 6 (2018)

Season 7 (2019)

Season 8 (2020)

Season 9 (2020–2021)

Season 10 (2021–2022)

Season 11 (2023)

Where Are They Now?

References

My 600